Nardo Mormile (died 1493) was a Roman Catholic prelate who served as Archbishop of Sorrento (1480–1493).

Biography
On 12 May 1480, Nardo Mormile was appointed during the papacy of Pope Sixtus IV as Archbishop of Sorrento. He served as Archbishop of Sorrento until his death in 1493.

References

External links and additional sources

15th-century Roman Catholic archbishops in the Kingdom of Naples
Bishops appointed by Pope Sixtus IV
1493 deaths
People from Sorrento